Robin Rowland (1922–2022) was a British soldier, barrister, and judge.

References

1922 births
2022 deaths
British barristers
British judges